Jeust is a hill in the county of Schwalm-Eder-Kreis, Hesse, Germany.

References

Hills of Hesse
Mountains and hills of the Kellerwald